Sun Hongyi (born 28 July 1993) is a male taekwondo practitioner from China.

Personal life
He began the sport in 2007 at a school in Hulunbuir, before attending Beijing Sport University.

Career
He reached the quarter finals of the 2018 Asia Games. He competed at the 2019 World Championship in Manchester. He was selected for the Taekwondo at the 2020 Summer Olympics – Men's +80 kg after he won the Asian Olympic Qualification Tournament in Amman, Jordan in May 2021.

References

External links
 

1993 births
Living people
Taekwondo practitioners at the 2020 Summer Olympics
Chinese male taekwondo practitioners
Olympic taekwondo practitioners of China
Taekwondo practitioners at the 2018 Asian Games
21st-century Chinese people